() is a song by Japanese band Sakanaction. It was released on December 5, 2007 as a double A-side digital single alongside "Sample", two months before the band's second album Night Fishing. The song was inspired by frustration with the band's management during the Night Fishing writing sessions. The song received minor airplay in Hokkaido in January and February 2008, during the release of its parent album.

Background and development 

Sakanaction was first formed in 2005 in Sapporo, Hokkaido. The band gained exposure in Hokkaido after winning the audition to perform as a newcomer artist at the Rising Sun Rock Festival in Otaru in August 2006, and after demos of their songs "Mikazuki Sunset" and "Shiranami Top Water" performed well on College Radio Japan Sapporo. The band were signed to major label Victor Entertainment, and released their debut album Go to the Future on May 7, 2007, through Victor's BabeStar Label. The album was primarily promoted with the song "Mikazuki Sunset", which was widely promoted on radio stations in Hokkaido in May. On Go to the Future and Night Fishing, Sakanaction based themselves in Sapporo, and recorded their albums there.

Due to the response to the band's debut album Go to the Future, Sakanaction's A&R team pushed them to quickly follow this up with a second album. The majority of the songs present on the album were written specifically as an album, as opposed to the compilation-like nature of Go to the Future. The material for the album was created based on the response and criticism for their debut album, and the members realization that they should not be frightened to make bold changes.

Writing and production 

The song "Word" was inspired by the pressure the band's A&R team and musical director. The band's vocalist and songwriter Ichiro Yamaguchi found this frustrating, especially during a period of writer's block. In the original version of the song when Yamaguchi was composing it on the guitar, he began with the lyric . Yamaguchi created "Word" in response to "Atarashii Sekai" - a song that expressed optimistic feelings of wanting to travel, when he remembered walking with a girl beside a river at night. On "Word" he revisited these memories, instead applying a realistic lens to the event. He wanted to create a song that would make a person cry if they heard it on a winter's night, which was an idea he struggled to actualize until he was inspired by creating the lyric yoru ga bokura o tameshiteru na.

When the song was first performed in concert, the band originally gave the song the temporary title , and was written as a song to give to former Judy and Mary vocalist Yuki, however plans did not come to fruition.

Promotion and release 

On December 5, the songs "Word" and "Sample" were released as a two-track single to iTunes. "Word" began to receive airplay in mid-January, peaking at number 41 on the Sapporo Hot 100 mixed airplay and sales chart. This, however, was dwarfed by the success of "Sample", which reached number five on the same chart. "Word" was used as the ending theme song for the NHK FM radio program Music Square. The song has been performed twice during Sakanaction's live tours: during the 2nd Album Tour 2008 Night Fishing Is Good tour, and once again during Sakanaquarium 2011 Zepp Alive. Neither performance has been released by the band digitally or on a video album.

Music video 

The music video for the song was directed by Hiroshi Kondō, which was recorded in a studio in Tokyo on December 25. Kondō had previously directed the video for Sakanaction's song "Shiranami Top Water" earlier in 2007. It features Yamaguchi by himself in a studio, singing and dancing to the song against a projected back-drop of sky and water images. During the song's bass solo, the video changes to show footage of the band performing a concert together.

Critical reception 

Atsushi Sasaki of Invitation thought highly of "Word"'s style, likening it to the works of Kenji Ozawa.

Track listing

Personnel

Personnel details were sourced from Night Fishings liner notes booklet.Sakanaction'

All members – arrangement, production
Keiichi Ejima – drums
Motoharu Iwadera – guitar
Ami Kusakari – bass guitar
Emi Okazaki – keyboards
Ichiro Yamaguchi – vocals, guitar, songwriting

Release history

References 

2007 singles
2007 songs
Japanese-language songs
Sakanaction songs
Songs written by Ichiro Yamaguchi
Victor Entertainment singles